Lancaster Memorial may refer to:

 Lancaster Memorial (Netherlands)
 Lancaster Memorial (Luxembourg)